Soma Bhupala was an Indian politician belonging to Indian National Congress. He was elected as a member of Andhra Pradesh Legislative Assembly three times, in 1962, 1967 and 1972. He died on 18 August 2019 at the age of 92.

References

1920s births
2019 deaths
Indian National Congress politicians
Members of the Andhra Pradesh Legislative Assembly